The Newman–Penrose (NP) formalism is a set of notation developed by Ezra T. Newman and Roger Penrose for general relativity (GR). Their notation is an effort to treat general relativity in terms of spinor notation, which introduces complex forms of the usual variables used in GR. The NP formalism is itself a special case of the tetrad formalism, where the tensors of the theory are projected onto a complete vector basis at each point in spacetime. Usually this vector basis is chosen to reflect some symmetry of the spacetime, leading to simplified expressions for physical observables. In the case of the NP formalism, the vector basis chosen is a null tetrad: a set of four null vectors—two real, and a complex-conjugate pair. The two real members asymptotically point radially inward and radially outward, and the formalism is well adapted to treatment of the propagation of radiation in curved spacetime. The Weyl scalars, derived from the Weyl tensor, are often used. In particular, it can be shown that one of these scalars— in the appropriate frame—encodes the outgoing gravitational radiation of an asymptotically flat system.

Newman and Penrose introduced the following functions as primary quantities using this tetrad:

 Twelve complex spin coefficients (in three groups) which describe the change in the tetrad from point to point: .
 Five complex functions encoding Weyl tensors in the tetrad basis: .
 Ten functions encoding Ricci tensors in the tetrad basis:  (real);  (complex).

In many situations—especially algebraically special spacetimes or vacuum spacetimes—the Newman–Penrose formalism simplifies dramatically, as many of the functions go to zero.  This simplification allows for various theorems to be proven more easily than using the standard form of Einstein's equations.

In this article, we will only employ the tensorial rather than spinorial version of NP formalism, because the former is easier to understand and more popular in relevant papers. One can refer to ref. for a unified formulation of  these two versions.

Null tetrad and sign convention
The formalism is developed for four-dimensional spacetime, with a Lorentzian-signature metric. At each point, a tetrad (set of four vectors) is introduced. A complex null vector is then constructed by combining a pair of real, orthogonal unit space-like vectors. In the case of spherical coordinates, the standard choice is

The complex conjugate of this vector then forms the fourth element of the tetrad.

The former is the original one that was adopted when NP formalism was developed and has been widely used in black-hole physics, gravitational waves and various other areas in general relativity. However, it is the latter convention that is usually employed in contemporary study of black holes from quasilocal perspectives (such as isolated horizons and dynamical horizons). In this article, we will utilize  for a systematic review of the NP formalism (see also refs.).

In NP formalism, the complex null tetrad contains two real null (co)vectors  and two complex null (co)vectors . Being null (co)vectors, self-normalization of  naturally vanishes,

,

so the following two pairs of cross-normalization are adopted

while  contractions between the two pairs are also vanishing,

.

Here the indices can be raised and lowered by the global metric   which in turn can be obtained via

NP quantities and tetrad equations

Four covariant derivative operators 
In keeping with the formalism's practice of using distinct unindexed symbols for each component of an object, the covariant derivative operator  is expressed using four separate symbols which name a directional covariant derivative operator for each tetrad direction.

The operators are defined as

which reduce to  when acting on scalar functions.

Twelve spin coefficients 
In NP formalism, instead of using index notations as in orthogonal tetrads,  each Ricci rotation coefficient  in the null tetrad is assigned a lower-case Greek letter, which constitute the 12 complex spin coefficients (in three groups),

Spin coefficients are the primary quantities in NP formalism, with which all other NP quantities (as defined below) could be calculated indirectly using the NP field equations. Thus, NP formalism is sometimes referred to as spin-coefficient formalism as well.

Transportation equations: covariant derivatives of tetrad vectors 

The sixteen directional covariant derivatives of tetrad vectors are sometimes called the transportation/propagation equations, perhaps because the derivatives are zero when the tetrad vector is parallel propagated or transported in the direction of the derivative operator. 

These results in this exact notation are given by ODonnell:

The two equations for the covariant derivative of a real null tetrad vector in its own direction indicate whether or not the vector is tangent to a geodesic and if so, whether the geodesic has an affine parameter.

A null tangent vector  is tangent to an affinely parameterized null geodesic if , which is to say if the vector is unchanged by parallel propagation or transportation in its own direction.

 shows that  is tangent to a geodesic if and only if , and is tangent to an affinely parameterized geodesic if in addition . Similarly,  shows that  is geodesic if and only if , and has affine parameterization when . 

(The complex null tetrad vectors  and   would have to be separated into the spacelike basis vectors  and  before asking if either or both of those are tangent to spacelike geodesics.)

Commutators 
The metric-compatibility or torsion-freeness of the covariant derivative is recast into the commutators of the directional derivatives,

   

which imply that

 
 
 

Note: (i) The above equations can be regarded either as implications of the commutators or combinations of the transportation equations; (ii) In these implied equations, the vectors  can be replaced by the covectors and the equations still hold.

Weyl–NP and Ricci–NP scalars 
The 10 independent components of the Weyl tensor can be encoded into 5 complex Weyl-NP scalars,

  

In these definitions,  could be replaced by its trace-free part  or by the Einstein tensor  because of the normalization relations.

Einstein–Maxwell–NP equations

NP field equations
In a complex null tetrad, Ricci identities give rise to the following NP field equations connecting spin coefficients, Weyl-NP and Ricci-NP scalars (recall that in an orthogonal tetrad, Ricci rotation coefficients would respect Cartan's first and second structure equations),

These equations in various notations can be found in several texts. The notation in Frolov and Novikov
 is identical.

  
         
    

Also, the Weyl-NP scalars  and the Ricci-NP scalars  can be calculated indirectly from the above NP field equations after obtaining the spin coefficients rather than directly using their definitions.

Maxwell–NP scalars, Maxwell equations in NP formalism
The six independent components of the Faraday-Maxwell 2-form (i.e. the electromagnetic field strength tensor)  can be encoded into three complex Maxwell-NP scalars

   

with the Ricci-NP scalars  related to Maxwell scalars by

It is worthwhile to point out that, the supplementary equation  is only valid for electromagnetic fields; for example, in the case of Yang-Mills fields there will be   where  are Yang-Mills-NP scalars.

To sum up, the aforementioned transportation equations, NP field equations and Maxwell-NP equations together constitute the Einstein-Maxwell equations in Newman–Penrose formalism.

Applications of NP formalism to gravitational radiation field
The Weyl scalar  was defined by Newman & Penrose as

(note, however, that the overall sign is arbitrary, and that Newman & Penrose worked with a "timelike" metric signature of ).
From the definition of the Weyl tensor, we see that this means that it equals the Riemann tensor, . We can make the standard choice for the tetrad at infinity:

In transverse-traceless gauge, a simple calculation shows that linearized gravitational waves are related to components of the Riemann tensor as

assuming propagation in the  direction.

Far from a source, in nearly flat space, the fields  and  encode everything about gravitational radiation propagating in a given direction.  Thus, we see that  encodes in a single complex field everything about (outgoing) gravitational waves.

Radiation from a finite source
Using the wave-generation formalism summarised by Thorne, we can write the radiation field quite compactly in terms of the mass multipole, current multipole, and spin-weighted spherical harmonics:

Here, prefixed superscripts indicate time derivatives.  That is, we define

See also 
 Light-cone coordinates
 GHP formalism
 Tetrad formalism
 Goldberg–Sachs theorem

References

  Wald treats the more succinct version of the Newman–Penrose formalism in terms of more modern spinor notation.
  Hawking and Ellis use the formalism in their discussion of the final state of a collapsing star.

External links
Newman–Penrose formalism on Scholarpedia

Theory of relativity
Mathematical notation